Sami Rajaniemi (born August 20, 1992) is a Finnish ice hockey goaltender. He is currently an unrestricted free agent who most recently played with Timrå IK of the Swedish Hockey League (SHL).

Rajaniemi made his Liiga debut playing with JYP Jyväskylä during the 2013–14 Liiga season.

References

External links

1992 births
Living people
Finnish ice hockey goaltenders
JYP-Akatemia players
JYP Jyväskylä players
Lahti Pelicans players
Mikkelin Jukurit players
Oulun Kärpät players
Timrå IK players
People from Oulainen
Sportspeople from North Ostrobothnia